The 2001 Mount Union Purple Raiders football team was an American football team that represented the University of Mount Union in the Ohio Athletic Conference (OAC) during the 2001 NCAA Division III football season. In their 16th year under head coach Larry Kehres, the Purple Raiders compiled a perfect 14–0 record, won the OAC championship, and outscored opponents by a total of 582 to 155.

The team played its home games at Mount Union Stadium in Alliance, Ohio.

Schedule

References

Mount Union
Mount Union Purple Raiders football seasons
NCAA Division III Football Champions
College football undefeated seasons
Mount Union Purple Raiders football